Adolf Ulrik Wertmüller (February 18, 1751 – October 5, 1811) was a Swedish painter whose notable works include Danaë receiving Jupiter in a Shower of Gold.

Wertmüller was born in Stockholm and studied art at home before moving to Paris in 1772 to study under his cousin Alexander Roslin and French painter Joseph-Marie Vien. On July 30, 1784, Wertmüller was elected to the Royal Academy of Painting and Sculpture.

Wertmüller was commissioned by Gustav III of Sweden for a portrait of Marie Antoinette, which is now in the Nationalmuseum at Stockholm. In 1787, he produced his masterpiece Danaë, a work which proved controversial as one of the earliest female nude paintings exhibited in America.

Wertmüller first emigrated to the United States in May 1794 and continued his portrait work, most notably of General George Washington, but in 1796 was called back to Sweden, eventually returning to Philadelphia in 1800. Elizabeth B. Johnston, in her book Original Portraits of Washington (Boston, 1882), speaks of five portraits of Washington by Wertmüller, of which one, executed in 1797, was purchased by the U. S. government in 1878, and another is owned by the Historical Society of Pennsylvania.

Wertmüller was married to Elizabeth Henderson, granddaughter of noted early American painter Gustavus Hesselius, on January 8, 1801, and two years later retired to a plantation in Claymont, Delaware, where he lived the final years of his life. He died near Marcus Hook, Pennsylvania, aged 60.

Evaluation
His article in Appletons' Cyclopædia of American Biography says (regarding his portraits of Washington):  "Though the work of an excellent artist, they are hardly successful as portraits, for Wertmüller belonged to that ideal French school, which usually sacrificed truth to nature for elegance in execution." It later continues: "He was noted especially for his vivid coloring, 'Danae' being a good example of his powers in that respect."

Gallery

References

External links

Works by: Adolf Ulric Wertmüller
A Forgotten Artist: Adolph Wertmüller by Franklin D. Scott
Three New Sweden Artists: Gustavus Hesselius, Adolph-Ulrich Wertmüller & Paula Himmelsbach Balano
"Hesselius Family Papers, 1780-1820s", The Frick Collection/Frick Art Reference Library Archives. Papers include an inventory of Wertmüller's paintings at the time of his death and letters from Genet Campan, First Maid of Marie-Antoinette, regarding the portrait Wertmüller painted of Marie-Antoinette and her two children.

1751 births
1811 deaths
Artists from Stockholm
Swedish people of German descent
Swedish expatriates in the United States
People from Claymont, Delaware
American portrait painters
Swedish portrait painters
18th-century Swedish painters
18th-century Swedish male artists
Swedish male painters
19th-century Swedish painters
Painters from Delaware
19th-century Swedish male artists